Mistrust was a heavy metal band formed in Seattle, Washington in 1984. This band primarily consisted of vocalist Jeff L'Heureux, guitarists Owen Wright and Michael Winston, bassist Tim Wolfe, and drummer Chris Gohde. They recorded one album in their brief existence called Spin the World, which was originally released through C.O.M.A. Records in 1986 and again through Heart of Steel Records in 2009.

History

Background and formation (1981-1984)
Before joining Mistrust, vocalist Jeff L’Heureux was involved in a band called Culprit, which was first formed in 1981. They recorded one studio album in 1983 called Guilty as Charged. Meanwhile, guitarist Michael Winston and bassist Tim Wolfe played in a band called Rottweiller, appearing alongside various other artists, including Metal Church, on a compilation album in 1984 called Northwest Metalfest; this album also features the band Sato whose bass player was future Alice in Chains member Mike Starr. Winston and Wolfe left Rottweiler shortly afterwards to join guitarist Owen Wright, drummer Chris Gohde, and vocalist Kevin Wells in what was then the first incarnation of Mistrust. When asked why they chose Mistrust as their band name, Gohde replied, "I forget who came up with the name, but I think Owen did. We thought there was a lot of 'mistrust' in the world so kind[a] just went with it. And it sounded cool!" Things began to fall apart with Wells prompting the rest of the band to search for a different vocalist as they continued to hone their craft. Eventually, Jeff L'Heureux agreed to help out and sing on their demo but initially declined to join the band as he was still with Culprit at the time.

Spin the World (1985-1988)
In 1985, Mistrust recorded a song with L'Heureux as a part-time member called "Running for My Life", which later appeared on the compilation album Pacific Metal Project. When Culprit broke up following the departure of guitarist Kjartan Kristofferson (who would also later join Mistrust, albeit briefly) and bassist Scott Earl, L'Heureux became a full-time member of Mistrust. A year later, they released their first full-length album Spin the World, which was released through C.O.M.A. records in 1986. The release of this album brought them opening gigs with Alice Cooper, Stryper, and Loudness. However, the record failed to sell enough and things began to fall apart again culminating with Winston's departure from the group in 1987. Former Culprit guitarist Kjartan Kristofferson took his place for a brief period and the group continued performing shows and writing music but eventually they decided to call it quits in 1988.

Post-break-up (1988-present)
After the break-up, Owen Wright and Chris Gohde formed the band My Sister's Machine along with singer-guitarist Nick Pollock and bassist Chris Ivanovich; Pollock previously played guitar with singer Layne Staley in an early incarnation of Alice in Chains. They recorded two albums, Diva and Wallflower, before breaking up in 1994. 
In 2009, Mistrust reunited at the Feedback Lounge in West Seattle to celebrate the CD release of Spin the World through Heart of Steel Records.

Members
Owen Wright - guitar (1984-1987)
Tim Wolfe - bass (1984-1987)
Chris Gohde - drums (1984-1987)
Michael Winston - guitar (1984-1987)
Kevin Wells - vocals (1984)
Howard Dee Gray - vocals (1985)
Jeff L'Heureux - vocals (1985-1987)
Kjartan Kristoffersen - guitar (1987)

Discography
Spin the World (1986)
Other appearances

References

External links
Mistrust on Myspace

Musical groups from Seattle
Heavy metal musical groups from Washington (state)
Musical groups established in 1984
Musical groups disestablished in 1988
Musical quintets